The Todhri script is an 18th-century Albanian alphabetical writing system invented for writing the Albanian language by Theodhor Haxhifilipi, also known as Dhaskal Todhri.

History 
It is a complex writing system of fifty-two characters which was used sporadically for written communication in and around Elbasan from the late eighteenth century on. The earliest dated text in Todhri's script is Radhua Hesapesh (daybook) of a local merchant partnership known as Jakov Popa i Vogël dhe Shokët (Jakov Popa Junior and Friends). The entries in Todhri's script start on 10 August 1795 and continue until 1797. An even older text written in Todhri script was discovered recently in a family notebook in Elbasan, dated 1 January 1780. Other older texts possibly written by Todhri himself cannot be dated or confirmed.

The Todhri script was rediscovered in Elbasan by Johann Georg von Hahn (1811–1869) who published it in 1854 his work Albanesische Studien in Jena. He thought it was 'the original' Albanian script and a derivative of the ancient Phoenician script. Leopold Geitler (1847–1885) and Slovenian scholar Rajko Nahtigal (1877–1958) subsequently studied the script, concluding that it was derived primarily from the Roman cursive.

See also 
 Elbasan script
 Vithkuqi script
 Vellara script

References

Albanian scripts
Alphabets
Obsolete writing systems
Constructed scripts